Shidrovo is the name of several rural localities in Shidrovsky Selsoviet of Vinogradovsky District of Arkhangelsk Oblast, Russia:
Shidrovo (settlement), a settlement
Shidrovo (village), a village